The 1930 Ole Miss Rebels football team was an American football team that represented the University of Mississippi as a member of the Southern Conference during the 1930 college football season. In their first season under head coach Ed Walker, Ole Miss compiled a 3–5–1 record.

Schedule

References

Ole Miss
Ole Miss Rebels football seasons
Ole Miss Rebels football